The Journal of Negative Results in Biomedicine was a peer-reviewed open access medical journal. It published papers that promote a discussion of unexpected, controversial, provocative and/or negative results in the context of current research. The journal was established in 2002 and ceased publishing in September 2017. It was abstracted and indexed in the Emerging Sources Citation Index, Index Medicus/MEDLINE/PubMed, and Scopus.

References

External links
 

English-language journals
Publications established in 2002
Publications disestablished in 2017
General medical journals
BioMed Central academic journals
Creative Commons Attribution-licensed journals